Japanese occupation may refer to:
Occupation of Japan, the occupation of Japan by United States forces following World War II
Japanese occupation of British Borneo (territories now part of East Malaysia and Brunei)
Japanese occupation of Burma
Japanese occupation of Cambodia
Japanese occupation of the Dutch East Indies (territories now part of Indonesia)
Japanese occupation of the Gilbert Islands
Japanese occupation of Guam
Japanese occupation of Hong Kong
Japanese occupation of Malaya (territories now part of peninsular Malaysia)
Japanese occupation of the Philippines
Japanese occupation of Singapore
Japanese occupation of Thailand
Japanese occupation of Vietnam
Japanese occupation of the Andaman Islands
Japanese occupation of the Aleutian Islands
Japanese occupation of Attu
Japanese occupation of Kiska
Japanese occupation of various parts of China during the Second Sino-Japanese War
Japanese occupation of Manchuria; see Manchukuo, a Japanese puppet state in northeastern China

See also 
Japanese occupation government (disambiguation)
Japanese colonial empire
Korea under Japanese rule
South Seas Mandate
Taiwan under Japanese rule